Anthoni "Teun" Christiaan Beijnen (13 June 1899 – 13 July 1949) was a Dutch rower who competed in the 1924 Summer Olympics and in the 1928 Summer Olympics.

Beijnen was born in 1899 in Ophemert, Gelderland. In 1924 he won the gold medal with his partner Willy Rösingh in the coxless pair event. Four years later he was part of the Dutch boat which was eliminated in the second round of the men's eight competition.

Beijnen was a car enthusiast and twice raced in the Monte Carlo Rally.

Beijnen, who had been a heavy smoker, died in 1949 in Beusichem of heart failure aged 50.

References

External links
 profile

1899 births
1949 deaths
People from Neerijnen
Dutch male rowers
Olympic rowers of the Netherlands
Rowers at the 1924 Summer Olympics
Rowers at the 1928 Summer Olympics
Olympic gold medalists for the Netherlands
Olympic medalists in rowing
Medalists at the 1924 Summer Olympics
Dutch racing drivers
European Rowing Championships medalists
19th-century Dutch people
20th-century Dutch people
Sportspeople from Gelderland